The A586 is a road in England, which runs from Garstang to Blackpool, in Lancashire. 

Becoming Garstang Road, it runs west, bypassing Great Eccleston and Little Eccleston, and sharing with the A585 as Garstang New Road between Larbreck and Little Singleton, about  past St Michael's On Wyre. This is a wider, straighter stretch of road. From here, the road becomes progressively more urban as it reaches the suburbs of Blackpool. After , as Poulton Road it crosses the A587 at the Plymouth Road roundabout, and becomes Westcliffe Drive as it passes through Layton, and Talbot Road shortly after. The road continues as Talbot Road past Blackpool North railway station, and passes through the town centre one-way system, eventually terminating at Talbot Square  where it meets the A584 and A583 next to the North Pier. 

Roads in England
Roads in Lancashire
The Fylde